Lucie is a Czech rock band. After an initial period of stabilization of band members and musical style (1985-1987), they entered the music scene with their first single "Pár fíglů" in 1988. Over the next sixteen years, the band released seven studio albums, two concert albums, and one compilation album. On 2 October 2004, the group entered a "planned creative break" that ended in December 2012.

History

Formation and breakup
Lucie was founded by guitarist Robert Kodym and bass guitarist Petr (Břetislav) Chovanec (P.B.CH.), who had been performing together in the band Prášek. They eventually came up with the idea to form their own band. It was the year 1985, and the duo added Tomáš Waschinger on drums. They wrote a number of new songs, one of which was the hit "Lucie", which was later included on their self-titled debut album. The band was joined by Petr Franc on keyboards, and the last member became Michal Penk, on vocals. Several band members were getting better deals elsewhere, however, and Kodym, P.B.CH., and Michal Penk all gradually left the group. At this point, the early stage of Lucie ended.

Early albums and hiatus
Less than a year after the band's breakup, a revival was organized, with David Koller on vocals and drums. Keyboardist Petr Franc was replaced by Michal Dvořák, and Tomáš Waschinger left to perform military service. The band at this point consisted of guitarists Robert Kodym and P.B.CH., keyboardist Michal Dvořák, and singer/drummer David Koller. Thus, the band Lucie was reborn in its present incarnation. In 1988, the band played their first concert at the Chmelnice club in Prague. In June 1989, the still-unknown band played at the "Zastav To" concert at Žofín Palace on Slavonic Island in Prague. In June 1990, Lucie's self-titled first album was released, and went on to win a Gold Record. In the same year, Lucie helped symbolically escort out the last Russian soldier at a sold-out stadium show. The band's second studio album, In the Sky, came out in 1991. This helped Lucie become the most popular band in the country, and they solidified this position with their victory in the Czech Grammys, the Annual Czechoslovak Music Awards (today known as the Anděl Awards) . Following the Lucie Live! tour of 1992 and the release of the live double album, the paths of the individual members diverged again.

Return
The band did not reunite until 1993, this time without P.B.CH., who had decided to continue on a solo path. He was replaced by the Slovak bass player Marek Minárik. The new album Černý kočky mokrý žáby, the band's heaviest up to that point, came out in 1994. That year Lucie triumphed at the Czech Grammys, winning 5 awards in total. They followed this with a one-year break.
At the end of 1996, they released the album Pohyby and launched a massive tour.

In 1996 Lucie also celebrated their 10th anniversary, and went back into the studio to work on their next album. The band's success was confirmed in 1996 and 1997 when they won bronze awards in the recently relaunched Český slavík ("Czech nightingale") (successor to Zlatý slavík) awards. After they released the album Větší než malé množství lásky, they were rejoined by former bass player P.B.CH. Following that year's concert tour, the band's popularity rose again and culminated in a silver award at Český slavík.

The album Větší než malé množství lásky raised controversy with the songs "Medvídek" and "Panic". It went on to become their best-selling record to date, partly due to TV Nova's refusal to play the controversial song "Medvídek", which supposedly promoted the distribution and use of illicit drugs.

In 1999, the group released their first compilation album, Vše nejlepší 88–99, and for the first time reached gold status in the Český slavík awards.

New millennium, new album
In 2000, the band released the album Slunečnice and got ready to tour the Czech Republic and the United States. After the tour, Lucie secured their gold status in Český slavík and prepared another album, which was released in October 2002, with the title Dobrá kočzka která nemlsá.
In the years 2001 and 2002, the band maintained their top spot in Český slavík, for the third and fourth time. In 2003, keyboardist Michal Dvořák was fired and replaced by guitarist Tomáš Vartecký (Wanastowi Vjecy, Kollerband, Daniel Landa). The recording of the live performance of Lucie in the Opera was released in 2004 as a double album, and the band performed several acoustic concerts in the Czech Republic, England, and the USA. In 2003 and 2004 Lucie won awards (silver and bronze, respectively) in Český slavík for the last time.

Present
At the turn of the year 2005, a new album was expected, but David Koller, Robert Kodym, and P.B.CH. began to diverge musically, and these differences climaxed with Koller's departure from the band. "I found out about his departure just like anyone else, from the Czech News Agency," said Kodym. The media speculated on the breakup of the group, and its future was uncertain. On 23 February 2011, the band in its best-known incarnation (Dvořák, Kodym, Koller, P.B.CH.) took part in the 20th annual Anděl Awards (Anděl 2010), gathering on stage together in order to receive the title  Best Album in Twenty Years  (Černý kočky mokrý žáby, accepted by Koller and Dvořák),  Best Band in Twenty Years  (Kodym and P.B.CH. went to receive it and were joined by Koller and Dvořák), and finally, Best Artist in Twenty Years (received by the whole band). At the end of 2011, Kodym stated that he did not rule out the possibility of Lucie's return to the stage. The other members confirmed a possible return. This reunion was anticipated to take place in 2013 — 2014. A private concert was held on 7 December 2012 in Prague's Rudolfinum auditorium, this being the first time in almost 10 years that the band performed on the same stage in its most notable lineup . Two days later, Lucie officially confirmed that they would be "rehearsing" together in the spring of 2013 during Kapka naděje charity concerts. Kapka naděje is a charity fund organized to help sick children, especially those suffering from hemopoiesis, cancer, and children whose disease requires bone marrow transplants.

A new studio album, EvoLucie, was released on 9 November 2018, and the band went on the road to promote it with an indoor tour of the Czech Republic and Slovakia.

Band members

Current
 Robert Kodym – guitars, vocals
 P.B.CH. – bass guitar
 David Koller – drums, vocals, acoustic guitars
 Michal Dvořák – keyboards, synthesizers

Touring
 Adam Koller – drums
 Lenka Dusilová – guitars, vocals

Past
 Marek Minárik – bass guitar
 Michal Penk – vocals
 Petr Franc – keyboards
 Tomáš Waschinger – drums
 Tomáš Marek – drums, percussion
 Tomáš Vartecký – guitars
 Pavel Plánka – percussion

Discography

Studio albums
 Lucie (Tommü Records; re-issued by B&M Music, 1990)
 In the Sky (Gang Records; re-issued by B&M Music, 1991)
 Černý kočky mokrý žáby (B&M Music, 1994)
 Pohyby (B&M Music, 1996)
 Větší než malé množství lásky (B&M Music, 1998)
 Slunečnice (B&M Music, 2000)
 Dobrá kočzka která nemlsá (B&M Music / Universal Music, 2002)
 EvoLucie (2018)

Compilations
 Vše nejlepší 88–99 (B&M Music, 1999)
 The best of (Universal Music, 2009)
 Platinum Combo 1990-2013 (Universal Music, 2013)

Live albums
 Lucie Live! red and blue albums (2CD) (Gang Records 1992; re-issued by B&M Music, 1998)
 Lucie v opeře 2CD (Sony BMG, 2003)

Singles
 "Pár fíglů" (Supraphon, 1988) (B-side: "To jsem já")
 "Dotknu se ohně" (Supraphon, 1989) (B-side: "Nech to stát")
 "Troubit na trumpety by se nám líbilo" (Supraphon, 1989)
 "Amerika" (1994)
 "Všechno ti dávám" (1996)
 "Klobouk ve křoví" (1997)
 "Pohyby" (1997)
 "Svítání" (1998)
 "Panic" (1998)
 "Medvídek / Svítání" (1998)
 "Mít tě sám (Remaster '99) / Šrouby do hlavy (Remaster '99)" (1999)
 "Zakousnutej do tebe" (2001)
 "Hvězda (radio edit)" (2001)
 "Srdce" (2002)
 "Pod měděným nebem" (2003)
 "Medvídek 2016" (2015)

Video albums
 Obrazohled aneb daleká cesta VHS (B&M Music, 1998)
 Pohyby – live DVD (B&M Music, 1998)
 Lucie v opeře DVD (Sony BMG, 2004)

Books
 Dědek, Honza. Lucie : šrouby do hlavy. Prague : HAK, 2000. 284 p. .
 Žďárská, Lucie. Můj život s Lucií, aneb pohled do zákulisí. Prague : Hart, 2001. 168 p. .

Awards
 Bratislavská lyra (cs) - Silver prize for "Mít tě sám" (1990)

References

External links
 

Czechoslovak rock music groups
Czech rock music groups
Czech pop music groups
Musical groups from Prague
Musical groups established in 1985
1985 establishments in Czechoslovakia